The Best of David Benoit 1987–1995 is an album by American pianist David Benoit released in 1994, recorded for the GRP label. The album reached #25 on Billboard Jazz chart.
The Best of David Benoit 1987–1995 is a retrospective of Benoit's GRP releases, and also contains some previously unreleased material.

Track listing

Personnel
David Benoit – Piano, Synthesizer
Eric Marienthal – Saxophone
Paul Jackson Jr. – Guitar
Nathan East – Bass
Michael Fisher – percussion
Ricky Lawson – Drums
Jerry Hey – Horns
Gary Grant – trumpet
Charles Loper – trombone

Track information and credits adapted from AllMusic, then verified from the album's liner notes.

Charts

References

External links
The Best of David Benoit 1987-1995 at Discogs

1995 compilation albums
David Benoit (musician) albums
Albums produced by Nathan East
GRP Records compilation albums